Framryggen Ridge is a small rock ridge about  west of Borg Mountain in Queen Maud Land, Antarctica. It was mapped by Norwegian cartographers from surveys and air photos by the Norwegian–British–Swedish Antarctic Expedition (1949–52) and named Framryggen (the forward ridge).

References

Ridges of Queen Maud Land
Princess Martha Coast